Limonium paulayanum is a species of plant in the family Plumbaginaceae. It is endemic to Yemen.  Its natural habitats are subtropical or tropical dry shrubland and rocky areas.

References

Endemic flora of Socotra
paulayanum
Least concern plants
Taxonomy articles created by Polbot